The 2015 South Sudan Football Championship was the 3rd season of the South Sudan Football Championship, the top-level football championship of South Sudan.

Teams
A total of 12 teams played in the championship.

References

Football leagues in South Sudan
South Sudan
Football Championship